Typhoon Wayne, known in the Philippines as Typhoon Katring, was an intense tropical cyclone that brought significant flooding to the Philippines in July 1983. The typhoon originated from an area of disturbed weather that formed far from land towards the end of July. Late on July 22, Wayne developed gale-force winds while moving west. The next day, it was estimated to have become a typhoon, and Wayne subsequently entered a period of rapid deepening. By the time it moved ashore in southern China on July 25, Wayne had weakened considerably. After moving inland, Wayne weakened rapidly. The following day, Wayne was no longer a tropical cyclone.

Typhoon Wayne became the second typhoon to strike the Philippines within nine days. Furthermore, 42 people lost their lives in flood waters while attempting to cross a temporary bridge. A total of 28 persons were hurt and 39 were rescued, and there were initially reports of up to 200 people missing. Although Wayne passed south of Taiwan, moderate flooding was reported due to rough seas. Elsewhere, in China, Wayne was the fifth most intense typhoon on record to impact Fujian between 1960 and 2005. Throughout China, 440 persons were injured, 105 people died, and 30,000 dwellings collapsed. Overall, 147 people were killed due to Typhoon Wayne.

Meteorological history

Typhoon Wayne originated from an elongated surface trough west of Truk. Initially, the trough was poorly organized, but after 1200 UTC on July 21, satellite imagery indicated an increase in the  organization and convective activity of the system. Based on this, a Tropical Cyclone Formation Alert (TCFA) was issued late on July 21 by the Joint Typhoon Warning Center (JTWC). Early the next day, Hurricane Hunters estimated that the system developed into a tropical depression, and the JTWC subsequently initialized warnings. Around this time, the Japan Meteorological Agency (JMA) started monitoring the system.

During the next 24 hours, Wayne began to intensify and was soon upgraded into a tropical storm by the JTWC. The JMA first classified the low as a tropical storm at 1800 UTC on July 22 while the system generally moved west. By early July 23, the JTWC upgraded the storm into a typhoon while the JMA upgraded the system to a severe tropical storm. Around this time, aircraft reconnaissance revealed an eyewall and a small inner core. Six hours later, the JMA upgraded Wayne to a typhoon. The storm continued to rapidly deepen, and within 24 hours, Typhoon Wayne had more than doubled in intensity according to the JTWC. Meanwhile, the cyclone moved westward along the southern periphery of the subtropical ridge in a low wind shear environment. According to the JTWC, Wayne was also a super typhoon. As Super Typhoon Wayne passed north of Luzon, the low-level atmospheric circulation was disrupted north of the storm by the high terrain of Taiwan and thus Wayne weakened. Wayne struck the coast of China at typhoon strength according to JTWC, but rapidly dissipated as it moved inland over the mountainous terrain of southeastern China. By 0000 UTC on July 26, the JMA ceased monitoring Typhoon Wayne.

Impact and aftermath
Upon affecting the Philippines, Typhoon Wayne became the second system to strike Luzon in nine days after Typhoon Vera. There, 42 people lost their lives including two children and 12 woman when they drowned in flood waters while trying to cross a damaged, but temporary bridge that was built after the 1981 Pacific typhoon season. Additionally, 28 people were injured and 39 were rescued. Initially, an estimated 100 to 200 people were listed as missing, many of which were believed to have drowned in floodwaters. Many motorists were stranded due to flooding.

Despite veering south of Taiwan, Wayne generated high waves, which flooded farmland. Typhoon Wayne was the fifth most intense tropical cyclone to impact Fujian between 1960 and 2005. Heavy rainfall led to severe flooding in Fujian and Guangdong. Across China, 105 persons perished. In addition, 440 persons were injured and 30,000 dwellings collapsed.

See also

Typhoon Ellen (1983)
Typhoon Meranti
Other storms named Wayne

Notes

References

External links
 General Information of Typhoon Wayne (8304) from Digital Typhoon
 JMA Best Track (Graphics) of Typhoon Wayne (8304)

Typhoons in China
1983 Pacific typhoon season
Typhoons
Wayne